The Tikhoretsk Single-member Constituency (No.51) is a Russian legislative constituency in Krasnodar Krai.

Geography
In Tikhoretsk single-member constituency included Beloglinsky, Vyselkovsky, Kavkazsky, Korenovsky, Novopokrovsky, Tbilissky, Tikhoretsky, Ust-Labinsky districts in eastern Krasnodar Krai. In addition, for this constituency assigned, the citizens of Russia living in Estonia, assigned to the Consulate General in Narva, territory of Narva-3.

Members elected
By-election are shown in italics.

Election results

1993

|-
! colspan=2 style="background-color:#E9E9E9;text-align:left;vertical-align:top;" |Candidate
! style="background-color:#E9E9E9;text-align:left;vertical-align:top;" |Party
! style="background-color:#E9E9E9;text-align:right;" |Votes
! style="background-color:#E9E9E9;text-align:right;" |%
|-
|style="background-color:"|
|align=left|Nadezhda Verveyko
|align=left|Independent
|
|14.94%
|-
| colspan="5" style="background-color:#E9E9E9;"|
|- style="font-weight:bold"
| colspan="3" style="text-align:left;" | Total
| 
| 100%
|-
| colspan="5" style="background-color:#E9E9E9;"|
|- style="font-weight:bold"
| colspan="4" |Source:
|
|}

1995

|-
! colspan=2 style="background-color:#E9E9E9;text-align:left;vertical-align:top;" |Candidate
! style="background-color:#E9E9E9;text-align:left;vertical-align:top;" |Party
! style="background-color:#E9E9E9;text-align:right;" |Votes
! style="background-color:#E9E9E9;text-align:right;" |%
|-
|style="background-color:"|
|align=left|Aleksandr Tkachyov
|align=left|Independent
|
|23.24%
|-
|style="background-color:"|
|align=left|Nikolay Kondratenko
|align=left|Independent
|
|20.94%
|-
|style="background-color:"|
|align=left|Mikhail Kovalev
|align=left|Communist Party
|
|20.55%
|-
|style="background-color:"|
|align=left|Konstantin Gorovoy
|align=left|Liberal Democratic Party
|
|12.16%
|-
|style="background-color:"|
|align=left|Vladislav Spiridonov
|align=left|Independent
|
|6.87%
|-
|style="background-color:"|
|align=left|Nadezhda Verveyko (incumbent)
|align=left|Power to the People!
|
|3.66%
|-
|style="background-color:"|
|align=left|Vladimir Girich
|align=left|Independent
|
|2.32%
|-
|style="background-color:"|
|align=left|Leonid Golubenko
|align=left|Independent
|
|1.62%
|-
|style="background-color:"|
|align=left|Nikolay Kotov
|align=left|Agrarian Party
|
|1.49%
|-
|style="background-color:#F21A29"|
|align=left|Aleksandr Kofanov
|align=left|Trade Unions and Industrialists – Union of Labour
|
|0.65%
|-
|style="background-color:#000000"|
|colspan=2 |against all
|
|5.16%
|-
| colspan="5" style="background-color:#E9E9E9;"|
|- style="font-weight:bold"
| colspan="3" style="text-align:left;" | Total
| 
| 100%
|-
| colspan="5" style="background-color:#E9E9E9;"|
|- style="font-weight:bold"
| colspan="4" |Source:
|
|}

1999

|-
! colspan=2 style="background-color:#E9E9E9;text-align:left;vertical-align:top;" |Candidate
! style="background-color:#E9E9E9;text-align:left;vertical-align:top;" |Party
! style="background-color:#E9E9E9;text-align:right;" |Votes
! style="background-color:#E9E9E9;text-align:right;" |%
|-
|style="background-color:"|
|align=left|Aleksandr Tkachyov (incumbent)
|align=left|Communist Party
|
|70.98%
|-
|style="background-color:"|
|align=left|Zinaida Rakhno
|align=left|Independent
|
|6.00%
|-
|style="background-color:"|
|align=left|Sergey Danilenko
|align=left|Independent
|
|5.33%
|-
|style="background-color:"|
|align=left|Nikolay Turekov
|align=left|Liberal Democratic Party
|
|4.15%
|-
|style="background-color:#020266"|
|align=left|Natalia Motyzheva
|align=left|Russian Socialist Party
|
|2.64%
|-
|style="background-color:"|
|align=left|Grigory Pogrebnoy
|align=left|Our Home – Russia
|
|1.46%
|-
|style="background-color:#000000"|
|colspan=2 |against all
|
|8.24%
|-
| colspan="5" style="background-color:#E9E9E9;"|
|- style="font-weight:bold"
| colspan="3" style="text-align:left;" | Total
| 
| 100%
|-
| colspan="5" style="background-color:#E9E9E9;"|
|- style="font-weight:bold"
| colspan="4" |Source:
|
|}

2001

|-
! colspan=2 style="background-color:#E9E9E9;text-align:left;vertical-align:top;" |Candidate
! style="background-color:#E9E9E9;text-align:left;vertical-align:top;" |Party
! style="background-color:#E9E9E9;text-align:right;" |Votes
! style="background-color:#E9E9E9;text-align:right;" |%
|-
|style="background-color:"|
|align=left|Nikolay Denisov
|align=left|Independent
|
|58.83%
|-
|style="background-color:"|
|align=left|Tatyana Pavlovskaya
|align=left|Independent
|
|10.10%
|-
|style="background-color:"|
|align=left|Marina Meshcheryakova
|align=left|Independent
|
|9.65%
|-
|style="background-color:"|
|align=left|Sergey Danilenko
|align=left|Independent
|
|7.54%
|-
|style="background-color:"|
|align=left|Natalia Motyzheva
|align=left|Independent
|
|3.62%
|-
|style="background-color:"|
|align=left|Gennady Deminenko
|align=left|Independent
|
|1.82%
|-
|style="background-color:"|
|align=left|Aleskey Guzeev
|align=left|Independent
|
|1.13%
|-
|style="background-color:#000000"|
|colspan=2 |against all
|
|6.07%
|-
| colspan="5" style="background-color:#E9E9E9;"|
|- style="font-weight:bold"
| colspan="3" style="text-align:left;" | Total
| 
| 100%
|-
| colspan="5" style="background-color:#E9E9E9;"|
|- style="font-weight:bold"
| colspan="4" |Source:
|
|}

2003

|-
! colspan=2 style="background-color:#E9E9E9;text-align:left;vertical-align:top;" |Candidate
! style="background-color:#E9E9E9;text-align:left;vertical-align:top;" |Party
! style="background-color:#E9E9E9;text-align:right;" |Votes
! style="background-color:#E9E9E9;text-align:right;" |%
|-
|style="background-color:"|
|align=left|Aleksey Tkachyov
|align=left|Independent
|
|67.32%
|-
|style="background-color:"|
|align=left|Sergey Kryuchin
|align=left|Liberal Democratic Party
|
|8.12%
|-
|style="background-color:"|
|align=left|Zinaida Rakhno
|align=left|Yabloko
|
|6.00%
|-
|style="background-color:#00A1FF"|
|align=left|Gennady Deminenko
|align=left|Party of Russia's Rebirth-Russian Party of Life
|
|2.20%
|-
|style="background-color:#164C8C"|
|align=left|Anatoly Shalimov
|align=left|United Russian Party Rus'
|
|1.60%
|-
|style="background-color:#000000"|
|colspan=2 |against all
|
|13.13%
|-
| colspan="5" style="background-color:#E9E9E9;"|
|- style="font-weight:bold"
| colspan="3" style="text-align:left;" | Total
| 
| 100%
|-
| colspan="5" style="background-color:#E9E9E9;"|
|- style="font-weight:bold"
| colspan="4" |Source:
|
|}

2016

|-
! colspan=2 style="background-color:#E9E9E9;text-align:left;vertical-align:top;" |Candidate
! style="background-color:#E9E9E9;text-align:left;vertical-align:top;" |Party
! style="background-color:#E9E9E9;text-align:right;" |Votes
! style="background-color:#E9E9E9;text-align:right;" |%
|-
|style="background-color: " |
|align=left|Alexey Ezubov
|align=left|United Russia
|197,102
|67.69%
|-
|style="background-color: " |
|align=left|Aleksandr Nagnibeda
|align=left|Communist Party
|28,336
|9.38%
|-
|style="background-color: " |
|align=left|Nikolay Sytnik
|align=left|Liberal Democratic Party
|22,848
|7.85%
|-
|style="background-color: " |
|align=left|Vladimir Karpekin
|align=left|A Just Russia
|15,510
|5.33%
|-
|style="background:" |
|align=left|Denis Vashchenko
|align=left|Party of Growth
|8,955
|3.08%
|-
|style="background:" |
|align=left|Ilya Khalin
|align=left|Communists of Russia
|7,409
|2.54%
|-
|style="background-color: " |
|align=left|Lyudmila Lindblad
|align=left|Rodina
|6,873
|2.36%
|-
| colspan="5" style="background-color:#E9E9E9;"|
|- style="font-weight:bold"
| colspan="3" style="text-align:left;" | Total
| 291,168
| 100%
|-
| colspan="5" style="background-color:#E9E9E9;"|
|- style="font-weight:bold"
| colspan="4" |Source:
|
|}

2021

|-
! colspan=2 style="background-color:#E9E9E9;text-align:left;vertical-align:top;" |Candidate
! style="background-color:#E9E9E9;text-align:left;vertical-align:top;" |Party
! style="background-color:#E9E9E9;text-align:right;" |Votes
! style="background-color:#E9E9E9;text-align:right;" |%
|-
|style="background-color: " |
|align=left|Alexey Ezubov (incumbent)
|align=left|United Russia
|278,780
|72.76%
|-
|style="background-color: " |
|align=left|Artyom Belobritsky
|align=left|Communist Party
|41,153
|10.74%
|-
|style="background-color: " |
|align=left|Nikolay Sytnik
|align=left|A Just Russia — For Truth
|15,855
|4.14%
|-
|style="background-color: " |
|align=left|Gennady Dergachev
|align=left|Liberal Democratic Party
|15,229
|3.97%
|-
|style="background-color: " |
|align=left|Sergei Kusmakov
|align=left|New People
|12,621
|3.29%
|-
|style="background-color: " |
|align=left|Svetlana Konovalova
|align=left|Yabloko
|5,734
|1.50%
|-
|style="background-color: " |
|align=left|Valery Chayevsky
|align=left|Party of Pensioners
|4,662
|1.22%
|-
|style="background:" |
|align=left|Roman Shpakov
|align=left|Party of Growth
|3,768
|0.98%
|-
|style="background-color: " |
|align=left|Maksim Yasnetsky
|align=left|Civic Platform
|2,131
|0.56%
|-
| colspan="5" style="background-color:#E9E9E9;"|
|- style="font-weight:bold"
| colspan="3" style="text-align:left;" | Total
| 383,154
| 100%
|-
| colspan="5" style="background-color:#E9E9E9;"|
|- style="font-weight:bold"
| colspan="4" |Source:
|
|}

Sources
51. Тихорецкий одномандатный избирательный округ

Notes

References

Russian legislative constituencies
Politics of Krasnodar Krai